Raїssa Venables (born 1977) is an American photographer.

Background and education
Venables was born in 1977 in New Paltz, New York, USA. From 1993 to 1997, she attended the Arts Student’s League in New York City, concentrating on the Anatomy for Life Drawing. In 1999 she received a BFA in Photography and Ceramic Sculpture from the Kansas City Art Institute. She received a master's degree in photography at the Milton Avery Graduate School of Arts at Bard College and a MFA in Photography in 2002.

Philosophy and style

Venables' photographs deal with planar relationship, passage of time, motion, and perceptual fields, blurring the realm of the real world with the imagined one.

Venables is influenced by Early Renaissance Flemish painters like Jan van Eyck, Rogier van der Weyden and Robert Campin, particularly with their usage of colour and lighting. Venables' work is also influenced by the neo-cubistic approach to splitting and dissolving an object or space before reassembling them together. Curators make the comparison of Venables’ work with thematic perspective found in Medieval art, in which objects are arranged in accordance to their spiritual values as opposed to their natural ones.

Matthias Harder, director of the Helmut Newton Foundation in Berlin, wrote about the artist’s reason for taking this approach: “Venables’ real intention is to open up unfamiliar  perspectives and to transform real spaces into imaginary ones with realistic traits.”

Publications

Solo exhibition catalogues
 Raïssa Venables. Ostfildern-Ruit, Germany: Hatje Cantz, 2006. With a foreword by Monika Machnicki, essays by Matthias Harder and Monika Machnicki and a transcript of an interview between Venables and Lori Waxman. Touring exhibition catalogue. 
 Raïssa Venables, BAT CampusGalerie Exhibition. Bayreuth, Germany: CampusGalerie of British American Tobacco, 2010. . With an essay by Ulf Erdmann Ziegler. Exhibition catalogue.

Group exhibition catalogues
 Lange, Christiane, and Nils Ohlsen. Realismus: das Abenteuer der Wirklichkeit = Realism: the adventure of reality. Munich: Hirmer, 2010. . "Catalog of an exhibition held at the Kunsthalle Emden, January 23-May 24, 2010, and Kunsthalle der Hypo-Kulturstiftung, Munich, June 11-September 5, 2010."
 Real: Photographs from the Collection of the DZ Bank. Germany: Hatje Cantz, 2010. Edited by Luminita Sabau. . With contributions by Walter Grasskamp, Sabau, Martin Seel, et al.. German and English. Exhibition catalogue.

Solo exhibitions
Raissa Venables: Intimacies, Jersey City Museum, New Jersey.
Raissa Venables, Klaudia Marr Gallery, Santa Fe, NM.

Collections
Venables' work is held in the following permanent public collections:
, Emden, Germany
Nelson-Atkins Museum of Art, Kansas City, Missouri (Hall Family Foundation gift): 1 print, "Cupola" (2005)
Anderson Museum of Contemporary Art, New Mexico: 1 print, "Yellow Steps" (2007)

References

External links

1977 births
Living people
Kansas City Art Institute alumni
American women photographers
21st-century American women